Taslima or Tasleema (Arabic: تسْليما \ تسْليمة taslīmah), also spelled Taslimah or Tasleemah, is an Arabic female given name. It has many possible meanings, including "greeting," "submission," "obedience, acceptance, preservation, salutation, compliance (surrender), submission (اِسْتِسْلام istislām)," or "satisfaction, gratification, willingness, delight."

The name stems from the male noun-name Salaam and the male form of the name is Taslim.

Given name

 Taslima Nasrin, Bangladeshi physician, author, and women's rights activist
 Taslima Akhter, Bangladeshi activist and photographer
Taslima Abed- Bangladesh politician and former government minister.

Arabic feminine given names
Bangladeshi feminine given names